Lesbian, gay, bisexual, transgender (LGBT) persons in Yemen face legal challenges not experienced by non-LGBT residents. Same-sex adultery is punishable by death, though that has not been enforced. LGBT persons additionally face stigmatization among the broader population.

Legality of same-sex sexual acts

Republic of Yemen

Constitutional law 

The Constitution of Republic of Yemen, amended in 2001, does not explicitly address LGBT rights. It does guarantee certain human rights to all citizens, with the condition that all legislation must be compatible with principles of Islamic Shariah law.

Penal Code 

Punishment for homosexuality in Yemen can originate from the codified penal code, or from people seeking to enforce traditional Islamic morality.

Article 264 of the national penal code prohibits private consensual homosexual acts between adult men. The stipulated punishment in the law for unmarried men is 100 lashes and up to a year in prison. The law stipulates that married men convicted of homosexuality are to be put to death.

Article 268 of the national penal code prohibits private consensual homosexual acts between adult women. The law stipulates that premeditated acts of lesbianism are punished with up to three years in prison.

In addition to the penal code, punishment for homosexuality can originate from people seeking to enforce traditional Islamic morality within their own family or for the broader society. In vigilante cases such as this, the punishment for homosexuality is oftentimes death.

Yemeni Civil War (2014–present)

al-Qaeda in the Arabian Peninsula
In 2013 there were credible reports of members of the al-Qaeda in the Arabian Peninsula were killing men for allegedly being gay.

Islamic State

Media censorship 

The government blocks access to webpages that express support of LGBT rights. This policy of censorship also extends to publications and magazines in Yemen.

In 2012, the magazine Al Thaqafiya was shut down by the government for publishing a review of the Egyptian film titled, Heena Maysara (translates to "Till things get better"). The reviewer, a Yemeni filmmaker named Hamid Aqbi, expressed some support for LGBT rights while discussing the film.

In 2004, the Yemem Times, an English-language magazine, was allowed to publish an opinion piece opposing legal recognition of gay marriage.

In 2003, the Week, an Arabic-language magazine, published an article that included interviews with Yemeni men imprisoned for homosexuality. The three journalists involved with the article were convicted by the government.

Summary table

See also

Human rights in Yemen
LGBT in the Middle East
Death penalty for homosexuality

References

Yeman
Human rights in Yemen
Yemen
Law of Yemen
Yemen
LGBT in Yemen